EliteXC: Unfinished Business was a mixed martial arts event held by EliteXC on July 26, 2008 in Stockton, CA at Stockton Arena.

Background
The show was officially announced during the Showtime broadcast of EliteXC: Return of the King.  

The main event featured a rematch between Middleweight Champion Robbie Lawler and Scott Smith, whose match on the EliteXC: Primetime CBS broadcast was stopped due to an unintentional eye poke.  This event was the second EliteXC event to air on CBS.  In addition, the events preliminary bouts aired on Showtime at 8pm EST, one hour before the 9pm EST start time on CBS.

The event drew an estimated 2,620,000 viewers on CBS.

Results

Fighter earnings
Total fighter payouts: $533,501.

Drew Montgomery: $3,000 ($1,500 win bonus) defeated Brandon Tarn: $2,000
Carl Seumanutafa: $4,000 ($2,000 win bonus) defeated Mike Cook: $2000
David Douglas: $4,000 ($1,500 win bonus) defeated Marlon Matias: $2,500
Anthony Ruiz: $5,001 ($3,000 win bonus) defeated Jeremy Freitag: $2,5000
Wilson Reis: $5,000 ($2,500 win bonus) defeated Bryan Caraway: $2,000
Rafael Cavalcante: $20,000 ($10,000 win bonus) defeated Travis Galbraith: $5,000
Antonio Silva: $200,000 ($100,000 win bonus) defeated Justin Eilers: $20,000
Cris Cyborg: $6,000 ($3,000 win bonus) defeated Shayna Baszler: $8,000
Jake Shields: $45,000 ($10,000 win bonus) defeated Nick Thompson: $25,000
Nick Diaz: $60,000 (no win bonus) defeated Thomas Denny: $8,500
Robbie Lawler: $90,000 (which included a $45,000 win bonus) defeated Scott Smith: $14,000

See also 
 Elite Xtreme Combat
 2008 in Elite Xtreme Combat

References

External links
Official EliteXC Site
EliteXC: Events List

Unfinished Business
2008 in mixed martial arts
Mixed martial arts in California
Sports competitions in Stockton, California
2008 in sports in California
CBS Sports